The Wichita Sky Kings are an American professional basketball team from Wichita, Kansas that plays in the Central Conference of The Basketball League (TBL).

History 
In November 2022, TBL's CEO, Evelyn Magley, announced that the Wichita Sky Kings will be playing in the Central Conference for the upcoming 2023 season.

The team is owned by Lebanese-American businessman Ben Hamd. Hamd is the founder of Brookwood Capital Advisors, a real estate investment company that redevelops properties across the U.S., including Wichita, Kansas. According to Hamd, the team's name is a nod to Wichita's aviation history as birth place of Cessna Aircraft Company, now owned by Textron. The name "Sky Kings" derives from 1950's radio-turned TV show Sky King about a Cessna aircraft pilot of the same name.

Sean Flynn was named as head coach for the Sky Kings' debut season. Flynn was head coach for the Pratt Community College Beavers from 2018 to 2021 where he held a 44 and 40 record. Flynn's assistant coach is former New Mexico State manager César Luján Flores.

It was announced that Brian Baumgartner, American actor known for playing Kevin Malone in the NBC sitcom The Office, will attend the Sky Kings' opening week on March 17 and 19. According to the team, Baumgartner's appearance will include a meet-and-greet for attendees.

The Basketball League (TBL) 
Founded in 2017, The Basketball League is a men's professional basketball league with 40+ North American teams composed of players from Division 1 through Division 3 schools, as well as former NBA and international players.

The Sky Kings are among eight TBL teams in the central conference, including the Enid Outlaws, Little Rock Lightning, Pearland Texas Warriors, Potawatomi Fire, Rockwall 7ers, Shreveport Mavericks, and Southeast Texas Panthers.

The 2021 and 2022 TBL champions, the Enid Outlaws and the Shreveport Mavericks respectively, are in the Central Conference.

Players 
According to head coach Sean Flynn, the Sky Kings' roster is composed of players from Division I and Division II schools. Notable acquisitions include Teddy Allen, Charlie Marquardt, and Justin Moss. 

Teddy Allen formerly played for the New Mexico State Aggies, where he ranked 29th nationally in scoring and led the Aggies to an NCAA tournament win after scoring 37 points against Connecticut. During 2022 alone, Allen was recognized as WAC Player of the Year, WAC Tournament Most Valuable Player, and WAC Newcomer of the Year.   

From 2018-2019, Charlie Marquardt played for G-League NBA team the Brooklyn Nets. Marquardt went on to win the 2021 TBL championship with the Enid Outlaws and played for the Syracuse Stallions in 2022.

Justin Moss formerly played for Blue Collar U, the winning team of The Basketball Tournament 2022 and a $2 million purse.

Current roster

Home Arena 
The Sky King's home arena is Charles Koch Arena, a facility owned by Wichita State University. The arena was originally constructed in 1955, renovated in 2003, and has a seating capacity of over 10,500. It is home to Wichita State University's athletics program and hosts both basketball and volleyball tournaments.

Season 
The Sky's Kings' season lasts from March through June. The leagues' season ends with a championship tournament between finalist among all four TBL conferences.

References

External links 

 Sky Kings website

The Basketball League teams